Obra is a town, Tehsil and Assembly constituency of Uttar Pradesh which is recently upgraded from the stature of Nagar Panchayat in Sonebhadra district (Previously a part of Mirzapur District) in the Indian state of Uttar Pradesh. Obra is located 137 km from Varanasi at the Banks of Renu & Sone River with population of  46,574 As per 2011 India Census. State-owned UPRVUNL and UPJVUNL have a coal-fired  thermal power plant and a hydro electric power plant here, respectively . The before mentioned industries are the major source of employment either directly or indirectly . Recreational places in Obra include Jawahar Bal Udayan (Children's Park), Ambedkar Stadium, Lord Shiva's temple, Sone river banks, parsoi and kharatiya villages etc. Restructuring of government residential colony is ongoing ( as of 2020 ) as new power plants are being constructed.

Geography
It has an average elevation in the range of 315 and 485 metres.

Demographics
 India census, Obra had a 406,574 of which 204,804 are males while 201,770 are females as per report released by Census India 2011. Obra has an average literacy rate of 87% , higher than the state average of 67.68%: male literacy is around 91.5%, and female literacy is 86.9%. In Obra, 12.36% of the population is under 6 years of age.

Power stations
Obra stands by the side of the Renu & Sone rivers, tributaries of the Ganga. The environment around nicely supports the Thermal and Hydroelectric (Hydel) Power Station. The thermal station has 13 units with the total capacity of 1550 MW and the Hydel has a maximum capacity of 99 MW. Thermal power station-B houses India's first 200 MW installed and commissioned units.
Pushing aside heavy competition from home-bred companies like BHEL and L&T, South Korean's top power equipment manufacturer Doosan Heavy Industries & Construction Company's Indian arm, Doosan Power Systems India (DPSI), clinched two super-critical power projects of 1,320 MW each in Uttar Pradesh. the 2×660 MW Obra C project, in Sonebhadra district, would be a brownfield project and will cost R10,416 crore. The construction is now underway. Both the projects are expected to start generating 1320 MW of power each by 2021.

Economy
Apart from the power plants, stone-crushing and transportation are major employment providers . Retail shops also form a chunk of the economy.

Media and communications
All India Radio has a local station in Obra which transmits various programs of mass interest. It was started on 28.08.1993. It operates on 102.7 MHz. It mainly originates programmes in Hindi as well as in Bhojpuri.

Schools and Colleges and coaching

 Rajkiya Snatakottar Mahavidyalaya (Obra Degree College)
 Vidya Niketan Junior High School Sector-10
 Sacred Heart Convent School
 Obra Inter College
 Kiddies Care English School
 Shishu Shiksha Niketan
 Saraswati Shishu Mandir
 Career Convent educational school
 Bal Vidya Mandir
 Shiksha Niketan Intermediate College
 Modern Convent School
 Swami Satyananda Saraswati Vidyalaya
 Girls Inter College
 Saraswati Vidya Mandir
 Islamia School
 Islamia Inter College
 Atmaram Pvt ITI Gajraj Nagar, Chopan Road, Obra
 DAV Public School
 Vijay ITI
 om coaching center sector 8 obra
 English medium School, Govt.School, Billi Gav
Vikash coaching center  khairatiya

Religious places
 Sharda Mandir Chopan Road
 Hanuman Mandir, at junction of Chopan Road and VIP Road
 Maa Sheetla Mandir, Chopan Road
 gaytri mandir sec-8
 Someswar  Mahadev  Mandir, Bhalua Tola
 Shiv Mandir, Sector 10
 Islamia Mosque, VIP Road
 Sacred Heart Church, VIP Road
 Sankat Mochan Mandir, Sector 2
 Baba Bhuteshwar Darbar Cave, Sector 3 
 Buddha Vihar, Ambedkar Chauraha
 Chitra Gupta Mandir, Ram Mandir Colony
 Gurdwara Singh Sabha, Obra Sonebhadra
 Noori Maszid, Bhalua Tola
 Millat Nagar Mosque
 St.Luke's Church, sector-8
 Shiv Parvati Amar Gufa, Salaibanwa
 Geeta mandir , sector 8

Places to visit
 Jawahar Bal Udyaan (Children Park), VIP Road
 Water Treatment Plant, Sector 3
 Obra Dam
 Water Treatment Plant, Sector 10
 Ambedkar Stadium, Near Degree College
 Gandhi Maidan
 Sector 10 Hill
 Devil Garden

Notable People
 Anurag Kashyap
 Abhinav Kashyap
 Shubham Gupta

References

Cities and towns in Sonbhadra district